Michael S. Meldman (born ) is an American entrepreneur. He is the founder, chairman, and CEO of Discovery Land Company and one of the three founders of Casamigos tequila with George Clooney and Rande Gerber.

Early life 
Meldman was born in  Milwaukee, Wisconsin and grew up in Scottsdale, Arizona. He graduated from Stanford University in 1982.

Career 
After Meldman graduated in 1982 he began a career in residential real estate in the Bay Area of Northern California. In 1994, he launched Discovery Land Company with his first development, The Estancia Club, in his hometown of Scottsdale. Since Estancia, Meldman and Discovery Land Company have developed 25 total clubs in the Pacific, Caribbean, Europe, and North America.

In 2007, Meldman launched the Discovery Land Company Foundation to support non-profit organizations that benefit children and families in the communities that surround the developments.

In 2012, Meldman partnered with Rande Gerber and George Clooney to create Casamigos tequila.  In June 2017, it was sold to Diageo for $700 million, with an additional $300 million possible depending on the company's performance over the next ten years. Meldman's employees include Jack Brooksbank, husband of Princess Eugenie of York.

References 

1958 births
Living people
Chief executive officers
American real estate businesspeople
People from Milwaukee